Ben David Goodliffe (born 19 June 1999) is an English professional footballer who plays as a defender for  club Sutton United.

Club career

Early career
Born in Watford, Goodliffe played youth football for Tottenham Hotspur but was released at age 16 and joined Boreham Wood's academy. He made his senior debut on 7 February 2017 in a 5–0 FA Trophy win over Sutton United. He went on to make 4 further appearances for the club that season, all of which coming in the National League.

Wolverhampton Wanderers
In March 2017, it was announced that Goodliffe would join Wolverhampton Wanderers for an undisclosed fee on a two-year contract at the start of the summer transfer window. He scored once in 12 Premier League 2 appearances across the 2017–18 season. On 31 July 2018, Goodliffe joined National League side Dagenham & Redbridge on loan until January 2019. He made his debut on 4 August 2018 away to former club Boreham Wood, with Goodliffe sent off late on as Dagenham lost 1–0. He scored his first goal for the club on 1 December 2018 with a 90th-minute equaliser in a 2–1 win over Hartlepool United. In January 2019, his loan was extended until the end of the season. He scored once in 33 league matches during the 2018–19 National League. He was released by Wolves at the end of the 2018–19 season.

Sutton United
In July 2019, Goodliffe joined Sutton United of the National League. He scored twice in 35 league appearances during the 2019–20 campaign, which was ended prematurely due to the COVID-19 pandemic. Sutton United were promoted to EFL League Two as champions of the National League at the end of the 2020–21 season, with Goodliffe having made 34 appearances and scoring one goal. He was also included in the National League team of the season as number 5. On 29 June 2021, it was announced that Goodliffe had signed a new contract with the club, with his previous contract about to expire. He made his League Two debut on 7 August 2021 in a 2–1 defeat to Forest Green Rovers.

International career
Goodliffe has captained the England Colleges team. In March 2020, Goodliffe was named in the England C squad for the first time.

Personal life
He is the son of Jason Goodliffe, who played non-League football and is currently assistant manager at Sutton United. Goodliffe worked as a personal trainer whilst playing for Sutton United, prior to their promotion to League Two.

Career statistics

Honours
Sutton United
National League: 2020–21
EFL Trophy runner-up: 2021–22

Individual
 National League Team of the Season: 2020–21
 Sutton United Player of the Season: 2021–22

References

External links

1999 births
Living people
English footballers
England semi-pro international footballers
Sportspeople from Watford
Footballers from Hertfordshire
Association football midfielders
Tottenham Hotspur F.C. players
Boreham Wood F.C. players
Wolverhampton Wanderers F.C. players
Dagenham & Redbridge F.C. players
Sutton United F.C. players
English Football League players
National League (English football) players